Darwinia diminuta is a plant in the myrtle family Myrtaceae and is endemic to New South Wales. A small spreading shrub with white to pinkish tubular flowers arranged in pairs, with a restricted distribution mostly in the Sydney region.

Description
Flowers from spring to early summer.

Distribution and habitat
A rare species found in heathlands or dry sclerophyll forest in eastern New South Wales between Manly, Ingleside, Loftus and Helensburgh where it grows in poorly drained sandy soils.

Taxonomy and naming
Darwinia diminuta was first formally described by Barbara Briggs in 1962 and published in Contributions from the New South Wales National Herbarium. The species name diminuta  means "diminutive" and refers to the small size of the flower.

References

 

diminuta
Flora of New South Wales
Myrtales of Australia
Plants described in 1962
Taxa named by Barbara G. Briggs